George Samuel Sale (17 May 1831 – 25 December 1922) was a New Zealand station manager, cricketer, newspaper editor, goldminer, public administrator and university professor.

Life and career
Sale was born in Rugby, Warwickshire, England, in 1831. He was educated at Rugby School and Cambridge University (Trinity College), where he won the Members Latin Prize. He was elected a Fellow of Trinity in 1856, and in 1857 he began lecturing at Trinity in Classics.

Sale went to New Zealand in 1860 for health reasons. In May 1861 he became the first editor of The Press in Christchurch, but later that year he want to the Otago goldfields to take up mining. 

In January 1864 he played in the first match of first-class cricket ever played in New Zealand, top-scoring for Canterbury with 15 not out against Otago. In the second first-class match, a year later, he was top-scorer in Canterbury's first innings with 16.

In July 1864, Sale was appointed Treasurer of Canterbury Province. He was a member of the County of Westland, representing the Hokitika riding from 10 December 1868 to 16 April 1869. 

When the University of Otago was established in 1870 he was one of the three foundation professors, specialising in Classics, particularly Greek and Latin. He remained in that position until he resigned at the end of 1907. He returned to England after he retired, and died in London in December 1922, aged 91.

He married a Canadian, Margaret Fortune, in Kaitangata in June 1874. They had two sons and two daughters.

Honorific eponym
Sale Street in Hokitika is named in Sale's honour.

References

1831 births
1922 deaths
New Zealand farmers
New Zealand miners
Canterbury cricketers
Academic staff of the University of Otago
New Zealand public servants
Local politicians in New Zealand
People from Rugby, Warwickshire
People educated at Rugby School
Alumni of Trinity College, Cambridge
New Zealand editors
New Zealand magazine editors
Sheriffs of New Zealand